Keerom Dam is an arch type dam located on the Nuy River, near Worcester, Western Cape, South Africa. It was established in 1954 and has been renovated in 1989. The primary purpose of the dam is to serve for irrigation and its hazard potential has been ranked high (3).

See also
List of reservoirs and dams in South Africa
List of rivers of South Africa

References 

 List of South African Dams from the Department of Water Affairs and Forestry (South Africa)

Dams in South Africa
Dams completed in 1954